Yasnensky Urban Okrug is a municipal formation (an urban okrug) in Orenburg Oblast, Russia, one of the thirteen urban okrugs in the oblast. Its territory comprises the territories of two administrative divisions of Orenburg Oblast—Yasnensky District and the Town of Yasny.

It was established on May 1, 2015 by the Law #3027/832-V-OZ of Orenburg Oblast by merging the municipal formations of former Yasnensky Municipal District and granting the resulting entity urban okrug status.

References

Notes

Sources

Urban okrugs of Russia
States and territories established in 2015
2015 establishments in Russia
